John Picken (born August 9, 1957) is a Canadian former professional tennis player.

Picken, a two-time national champion in the under-18s, grew up in Burnaby, British Columbia and represented the Canada Davis Cup team from 1979 to 1983, registering wins in three singles rubbers.

Before competing professionally in the 1980s he played collegiate tennis for Pan American University, where he had fellow Canadians Josef Brabenec and Robert Bettauer as teammates.

See also
List of Canada Davis Cup team representatives

References

External links
 
 
 

1957 births
Living people
Canadian male tennis players
Racket sportspeople from British Columbia
Sportspeople from Burnaby
University of Texas–Pan American alumni
College men's tennis players in the United States